The Aro people or Aros are an Igbo subgroup that originated from the Arochukwu kingdom in present-day Abia state, Nigeria. The Aros can also be found in about 250 other settlements mostly in the Southeastern Nigeria and adjacent areas. The Aros today are classified as Eastern or Cross River Igbos because of their location, mixed origins, culture, and dialect. Their god, Chukwu Abiama, was a key factor in establishing the Aro Confederacy as a regional power in the Niger Delta and Southeastern Nigeria during the 18th and 19th centuries.

Origins and history 

The history of the Aros predates Igbo migration and founding of the kingdom of Arochukwu. Before Igbos started arriving to the Aro region in the 17th century, a group of Proto Ibibio migrated to the area. The Proto Ibibio group originally came from Usak Edet (Isanguele), a segment of the Ejagham in present day Southern Cameroon. The Ibibio founded states such as Obong Okon Ita and Ibom west of the Cross River. Igbo migrations led by Eze Agwu and Nnachi  into the Aro region started in the mid-17th century. These Igbo migrants were resisted by the indigenous Ibibio. The Aro-Ibibio wars and the migration of the Akpa from east of the Cross River, formed the nation during the turning point of the 17th century to the 18th century. The Igbo and Akpa alliance, defeated and assimilated the original Ibibio inhabitants after long years of warfare. By this time, the palm oil and slave trade was popular in the hinterland. By the mid-18th century, there were mass migrations of Aro businessmen to the Igbo hinterland and adjacent areas. This migration, influence of their god Chukwu Abiama through priests, and their military power supported by alliances with several related neighboring Igbo and eastern Cross River militarized states (particularly Ohafia, Abam, Ihechiowa, Abiriba, Nkporo, Afikpo, Ekoi, etc.) quickly established the Aro Confederacy as a regional economic power. However, Aro economic hegemony was threatened by the penetration of Europeans, mainly British colonists towards the end of the 19th century. Tensions finally led to bloodshed, and the Anglo-Aro war took place from 1901 to 1902. The Aro Confederacy stoutly resisted but eventually suffered defeat. This helped the British to occupy the rest of what became Eastern Nigeria.

Tradition 
The Aros have a rich tradition. One factor is the Ekpe society which is a sacred society originally from east of the Cross River. The highly religious and judicial society took a major part in Aro society. The use of the writing system, Nsibidi, was based on secret societies like Ekpe. Uli, another writing system, occurred mostly in the form of body art.

Another factor is the Chukwu Abiama Temple, which was mediated by the Aro priesthood. They influenced neighbors and allies before the British invasion and destruction of the Chukwu Abiama Temple and Aro priesthood. The Ekeleke masquerade activity was important in Aro settlements. Brought from the Aros in the western Niger Delta, it eventually spread to the Oguta area. They also were known for wearing the popular "George" cloth. The Ikperikpe warrior dance was very famous among warriors in the old days and continues to be in use.

Largest settlements in Eastern Nigeria 
Aro Ajatakiri: In Ikwuano, Umuahia, Abia State
Aro Achara: In Ama-asa, Isiala Ngwa, Abia State.
Aro Umu Nkpe: In Isiala Ngwa, Abia State.
Aro Nbawsi: In Isiala Ngwa, Abia State.
Aro Omoba: In Isiala Ngwa, Abia State.
Aro Okporoenyi: In Ikwuano area of Abia State.
Aro Iyama: In Ikwuano, area of Abia State.
Aro Amuru: In Ikwuano, area of Abia State.
Aro Ndizuogu: Ideato area of Imo State (The biggest of all the settlements).
Aro Ndi Ikerionwu: In Anambra State.
Aro Ajalli: In Anambra State.
Aro Nzerem: In Ebonyi State.
Aro Amokwe: In Udi area of Enugu State.
Aro Isuochi: In Abia State.
Aro Isiokpo/Igwurita Ikwerre area in Rivers State.
Aro Abagana: In Anambra State.
Aro Oru: In Imo State.
Aro Nempi: In Imo State
Aro Ngwa: In Abia State.
Aro Ezeagu: In Enugu State.
Aro Achi: In Enugu State.
Aro Oboro Ite
Aro Kalabari: In Rivers State.
Aro Opobo: In Rivers State.
 Aro Uturu: In Abia State
Aro Anwu Anwu: Eziukwu Durunnihe in Umudurunna ABBA Nwangele LGA Imo State
Aro Okija (Ndi Ezennia Awa Okoro Orji): Anambra State
Aro Egbuoma in [oguta] area of Imo state
Aro Abba, Nwangele, Imo state
Aro Ekwulobia
Aro Awa, Oguta, Imo state 
Arochukwu
Aro Confederacy
 Ezi Njoku History

References 

http://www.findarticles.com/p/articles/mi_m0438/is_1_35/ai_90331352/pg_5
https://web.archive.org/web/20071009081317/http://www.aronetwork.org/others/ibini.html
https://web.archive.org/web/20070322182431/http://www.aronetwork.org/others/index.htm
https://web.archive.org/web/20060212061924/http://africanevents.com/AroChuku2003AnnualDinner.htm

 
 
Ethnic groups in Nigeria
Ethnic groups in Cameroon
Ethnic groups in Equatorial Guinea